The Pankhurst Centre, 60–62 Nelson Street, Manchester, is a pair of Victorian villas, of which No. 62 was the home of Emmeline Pankhurst and her daughters Sylvia, Christabel and Adela and the birthplace of the suffragette movement in 1903.

Description
The Pankhurst's villas now form a centre that is a women-only space which creates a unique environment for women to learn together, work on projects and socialise.  It is a Grade II* listed building as of 10 June 1974.

Part of the centre is a museum, The Pankhurst Parlour, which has become a memorial to the suffragette movement. Its Edwardian style furnishings evoke the home of Mrs Pankhurst and her daughters. It is the only museum dedicated to telling the story of women's fight for the right to vote.

The Women's Social and Political Union was founded in the parlour of Emmeline Pankhurst's home in October 1903.

The Pankhurst Centre is run by volunteers and receives no public funding, relying solely on donations. The Representation of the People Act 1918 gave the vote to all men aged 21 and over and women aged 30 and over who met certain property qualifications. In its centenary year calls were made to fund the Pankhurst Centre to make it a major museum that tells the story of women's suffrage and the women's rights movement.

History 
62 Nelson Street was the home of Emmeline Pankhurst at the time she founded the Women's Social and Political Union in 1903. She moved there after the death of her husband, Richard Pankhurst in 1898.

The site became a grade II* listed building in 1974. In 1978, there was an application submitted to demolish the building, sparking a notable protest to keep the building as a museum and centre committed to women's issues.

The Parlour was the first room in the Pankhurst Centre to be redecorated and was the centre of attraction when Barbara Castle and Helen Pankhurst opened the centre on 10 October 1987.

The Pankhurst Centre suffered a break-in on 1 October 2019. Since then, donations have been made to repair the damage, including £10000 from The Cooperative Group.

The centre reopened on the 29th of August, 2021 after a major redevelopment project in the two galleries and the parlour during 2020.

Pankhurst Centre Garden 
In 2018, a newly designed garden, designed by Janet Leigh (a garden designer based in Stockport), was opened at the Pankhurst Centre in September 2018. The garden to mark the centenary of Votes for Women, and acknowledges the work of suffragettes. The garden was funded by an outsourcing campaign, with over 500 people contributing over £24,000 in 2017. The garden also provides a relaxation space for the women and children residents of Manchester Women's Aid.

See also

Grade II* listed buildings in Greater Manchester
Listed buildings in Manchester-M13
List of monuments and memorials to women's suffrage

References

Further reading

External links
Pankhurst Trust - official site
Background information on the Centre
www.pankhurstmuseum.com/ - museum site 

Organisations based in Manchester
Houses in Manchester
Grade II* listed buildings in Manchester
Museums in Manchester
Women's museums in the United Kingdom
History museums in Greater Manchester
Historic house museums in Greater Manchester
Women-only spaces
Emmeline Pankhurst